Lakehills is a census-designated place (CDP) in Bandera County, Texas, United States. The population was 5,150 at the 2010 census, making it the most populous place in Bandera county. It is part of the San Antonio Metropolitan Statistical Area.

History
Lakehills was originally known as Upper Medina Lake, until a post office substation was established in the area in the early 1960s. Two toll roads served the area until the late 1940s–early 1950s.

Geography
The town is on Medina Lake.

Demographics

2000 census
At the 2000 census there were 4,668 people, 1,874 households, and 1,330 families in the CDP. The population density was 154.1 people per square mile (59.5/km2). There were 2,807 housing units at an average density of 92.7/sq mi (35.8/km2).  The racial makeup of the CDP was 93.04% White, 0.43% African American, 0.75% Native American, 0.28% Asian, 0.06% Pacific Islander, 3.58% from other races, and 1.86% from two or more races. Hispanic or Latino of any race were 12.90%.

Of the 1,874 households 29.3% had children under the age of 18 living with them, 59.9% were married couples living together, 6.6% had a female householder with no husband present, and 29.0% were non-families. 22.8% of households were one person and 8.6% were one person aged 65 or older. The average household size was 2.49 and the average family size was 2.92.

The age distribution was 24.6% under the age of 18, 5.4% from 18 to 24, 28.2% from 25 to 44, 27.9% from 45 to 64, and 13.9% 65 or older. The median age was 41 years. For every 100 females, there were 100.5 males. For every 100 females age 18 and over, there were 101.5 males.

The median household income was $42,964 and the median family income  was $49,464. Males had a median income of $32,444 versus $26,158 for females. The per capita income for the CDP was $21,100. About 7.8% of families and 10.5% of the population were below the poverty line, including 16.9% of those under age 18 and 3.6% of those age 65 or over.

2010 census
As of the 2010 census, there were 5,150 people and 1,961 households. There were 3,143 housing units. The racial makeup of the CDP was 93.6% White, 0.7% African American, 0.5% Native American, 0.3% Asian, less than 0.1% Pacific Islander, and 1.7% from two or more races. Hispanic or Latino were 17.6% of the population.

The median household income was $54,754. About 14% of the population were below the poverty line.

2020 census

As of the 2020 United States census, there were 5,295 people, 2,179 households, and 1,275 families residing in the CDP.

Education
Lakehills is served by the Bandera Independent School District.

References

External links
 Handbook of Texas Online article

Census-designated places in Bandera County, Texas
Census-designated places in Texas
Greater San Antonio